

The Avia BH-9 was a twin-seat sports plane built in Czechoslovakia in 1923, based on the BH-5. As with other developments in the BH-1 lineage, the BH-9 was a low-wing braced monoplane that accommodated the pilot and passenger in tandem, open cockpits. The BH-9's structure was strengthened to allow the use of a higher-power engine than in its predecessors, and for the first time, this was a domestically-produced powerplant. Although built as a twin-seat aircraft at least one (registration L-BONF - see picture) was converted to a single-seater.

The Czechoslovakian Army showed interest in it as a trainer and liaison aircraft, and ordered ten examples under the designation B.9.

A B.9 won the 1925 Coppa d'Italia air race, and the following year, one was flown on a 1,800 km (1,100 mi) circuit Prague-Paris-Prague with an average speed of 131.2 km/h (82 mph).

Specifications

See also

References

 
 
 Němeček, V. (1968). Československá letadla. Praha: Naše Vojsko.
 airwar.ru

Single-engined tractor aircraft
Low-wing aircraft
1920s Czechoslovakian sport aircraft
BH-09